Louis Cohn "Lou" Scott (born September 4, 1945, in Detroit, Michigan) is an American long-distance runner who competed in the 1968 Summer Olympics.  He won a silver medal at the 1967 Pan American Games.

He continues to run, showing up in a local Senior Olympics race.  Running for Eastern High School, he was the Michigan State Champion in the mile in 1962 and 1963.  He was also the 1962 state Cross Country Champion.  His 4:11.3 in the summer of 1963 was the Michigan state record for seven years.

References

1945 births
Living people
American male long-distance runners
Olympic track and field athletes of the United States
Athletes (track and field) at the 1968 Summer Olympics
Athletes (track and field) at the 1967 Pan American Games
Arizona State Sun Devils men's track and field athletes
Track and field athletes from Detroit
Pan American Games silver medalists for the United States
Pan American Games medalists in athletics (track and field)
Medalists at the 1967 Pan American Games